Torzhok is a town in Tver Oblast, Russia, located on the Tvertsa River along the federal highway M10 and a branch of the Oktyabrskaya Railway division of the Russian Railways. The town is famous for its folk craft of goldwork embroidery. Population:

History

Torzhok was first mentioned in a chronicle in 1139 as Novy Torg. The Mongols burned it in 1238, but did not proceed northward to Novgorod. At that time, the town commanded the only route whereby grain was delivered to Novgorod. Once Torzhok blocked the route, a great shortage of grain and famine in Novgorod would follow. Consequently, Torzhok was known as a key to the Novgorod Republic and frequently changed hands during feudal internecine wars.

The town was incorporated into the Grand Duchy of Moscow with the rest of the Novgorod Republic in 1478. The armies of a Sigmund the III of Poland frequently ravaged it during the Time of Troubles. During the imperial period, Torzhok was known as an important post station on the highway from Moscow to St. Petersburg. Alexander Pushkin, for instance, used to pass through Torzhok on a number of occasions, and there is a museum dedicated to him in the town.

In the course of the administrative reform carried out in 1708 by Peter the Great, Torzhok was included into Ingermanlandia Governorate (since 1710 known as Saint Petersburg Governorate), and in 1727 Novgorod Governorate split off. In 1775, Tver Viceroyalty was formed from the lands which previously belonged to Moscow and Novgorod Governorates, and Torzhok was transferred to Tver Viceroyalty, which in 1796 was transformed to Tver Governorate. In 1775, Novotorzhsky Uyezd was established, with the center in Torzhok, and Torzhok was granted town status.

On July 12, 1929 the governorates and uyezds were abolished. Novotorzhsky District, with the administrative center in Torzhok, was established within Tver Okrug of Moscow Oblast. On July 23, 1930, the okrugs were abolished, and the districts were directly subordinated to the oblast. On January 29, 1935 Kalinin Oblast was established, and Novotorzhsky District was transferred to Kalinin Oblast. In February 1963, during the abortive administrative reform by Nikita Khrushchev, Torzhoksky, Likhoslavlsky, and Kamensky District were merged into a new district which was called Torzhoksky District. On March 4, 1964, Likhoslavlsky District, and on January 12, 1965, Kuvshinovsky District (which occupied the same area as the former Kamensky District) were re-established. Torzhoksky District retained the new name. In 1990, Kalinin Oblast was renamed Tver Oblast.

Administrative and municipal status
Within the framework of administrative divisions, Torzhok serves as the administrative center of Torzhoksky District, even though it is not a part of it. As an administrative division, it is incorporated separately as Torzhok Okrug—an administrative unit with the status equal to that of the districts. As a municipal division, Torzhok Okrug is incorporated as Torzhok Urban Okrug.

Economy
Torzhok has twenty-two large and medium-sized industrial enterprises. Two of them are especially significant. JSC Pozhtekhnika and OAO Torzhok Plant Printing Inks account for 70% of all industrial output.

Transportation
A railway line which connects Likhoslavl with Soblago via Selizharovo runs through Torzhok. Another railway line branches off in Torzhok and heads south to Rzhev via Vysokoye. Both lines are served by infrequent passenger traffic.

The M10 highway, which connects Moscow and St. Petersburg, passes close to Torzhok. A road to Ostashkov branches off to the west. There is also a road connecting Torzhok with Staritsa. There are local roads as well, with the bus traffic originating from Torzhok.

Architecture 
Architectural monuments of Torzhok include a number of parish churches, dating back to the late 17th or early 18th centuries. Under Catherine the Great, the old monastery of Sts. Boris and Gleb was redesigned in Neoclassical style by a local landowner, Prince Lvov. The main city church is the Savior-Transfiguration Cathedral, founded in 1374. The current edifice was consecrated in 1822. There is also Catherine the Great's diminutive travel palace.

UNESCO World Heritage Site Nomination proposal
In 2020, a project was presented in the nomination "Historical Center of Torzhok and Estate Architecture of Nikolay Lvov". Its first public discussion took place at a round table organized at the All-Russian Historical and Ethnographic Museum (Torzhok).The nomination project was approved by the leading experts in the field of architectural heritage who participated in the Round Table: Dmitry Shvidkovsky (President of the Academy of Architecture and Construction, Rector of Moscow Architectural Institute), Andrey Batalov, Mikhail Milchik, Konstantin Mikhaylov.

The project provides for the creation of a serial nomination, like the one that unites the main buildings of Andrea Palladio, Nikolai Lvov's creative landmark - "Vicenza and the Palladian Villas of Veneto". In addition to the main classicistic buildings of Torzhok, its general layout and architectural and landscape unity, the nomination was proposed to include buildings in the estates Znamenskoye-Raek, Pryamukhino, Pereslegino, Nikolskoye, Vasilevo.

Military
Torzhok air base located near the town which has in residence the 344th Center for Combat Employment and Retraining of Personnel of Army Aviation. The center operates the "Golden Eagles" combat helicopter aerobatic team. The 696th Regiment tests all current models and modifications of Russian military helicopters. The center uses Ka-50, Mi-8, Mi-24, Mi-26, and Mil Mi-28Н helicopters for training purposes.

In 2002 the center consisted of the:
696th Research-Instructor Helicopter Regiment (Troop Transport Helicopters) (Torzhok, Tver Oblast)
92nd Research-Instructor Helicopter Squadron (Sokol, Vladimir Oblast)
118th independent Helicopter Squadron (Chebenki, Orenburg Oblast) (though on 1.12.07 absorbed by the 4215th Aircraft Reserve Base)
2881st Helicopter Reserve Base (Totskoye-2, Orenburg Oblast)
Kushalino test range (from 2005) (Military Unit: 15478)

Notable people
Mikhail Bakunin (1814–1876), revolutionary anarchist
Alexej von Jawlensky, painter
Solomon Shereshevsky, mnemonist

Twin towns – sister cities

Torzhok is twinned with:
 Melle, Germany
 Savonlinna, Finland
 Slonim, Belarus

References

Notes

Sources

Further reading

External links

Official website of Torzhok 
Unofficial website of Torzhok 
Torzhok: The golden age of provincial Russia
Historic Town Centre of Torzhok and Country Estate Properties Designed by Nikolay Lvov. UNESCO Nomination

Cities and towns in Tver Oblast
Novotorzhsky Uyezd